Rutajärvi may refer to:

 Rutajärvi (Leivonmäki), a lake in Finland
 Rutajärvi (Urjala), a lake in Finland